The Spheciformes is a paraphyletic assemblage of insect families which collectively comprise the "sphecoid wasps". Larvae are carnivorous.

These are all the members of the superfamily Apoidea, which are not bees and which in older classifications were called the "Sphecoidea". Some are also described as mud daubers.

The group is paraphyletic because the bees are believed to have arisen from a subgroup within the family Ammoplanidae, thus Spheciformes does not include all of the descendants of its common ancestor.

References

 
Apoidea
Paraphyletic groups